Delias bothwelli is a butterfly in the family Pieridae. It was described by George Hamilton Kenrick in 1909. It is found in the Arfak Mountains of New Guinea.

References

External links
Delias at Markku Savela's Lepidoptera and Some Other Life Forms

bothwelli
Butterflies described in 1909